The 2019 Surrey Heath Borough Council election took place on 2 May 2019 to elect all members of Surrey Heath Borough Council in England. The elections were held on new boundaries. The Conservatives narrowly held a majority on the council, but it fell from fifteen to just one.

Summary

Election result

|-

Results by Ward

Bagshot

Bisley and West End

Frimley

Frimley Green

Heatherside

Lightwater

Mytchett and Deepcut

Old Dean

Parkside

St Michael's

St Paul's

Town

Watchetts

Windlesham and Chobham

By-Elections between 2019 and 2023

Bagshot (6 May 2021)
A by election was held following the death of Liberal Democrat Councillor Sam Kay.

Frimley Green (14 October 2021)
A by election was held in Frimley Green following the resignation of Liberal Democrat Councillor Benjamin Leach.

Bisley and West End (14 April 2022) 
A by election was held in Bisley and West End following the resignation of Conservative Councillor David Mansfield.

References

Surrey Heath
Surrey Heath Borough Council elections